The Smokers is a 2000 American black comedy film directed and written by Christina Peters. It was released on DVD on February 5, 2002.

Plot
Three rebellious teenage girls decide to even the score in the battle of the sexes. Looking back a few years after the events depicted, Jefferson Roth (who, along with her sisters are named after former presidents) tells the story of the last few months of her senior year at a Wisconsin boarding school when she and two girl friends, the naive Lisa and the outrageous Karen, conspire to use a pistol to turn the tables on males after a wealthy older man, with whom Karen had a one-night stand, refuses to give her his home phone number. They stage a sexual assault on David, Lisa's on-and-off boyfriend, in an effort to try to be more like their male counterparts. However, it backfires, as all three girls learn they are not able to have sex the way they feel a man can. Their unfaithfulness to their own objective is summed up in Karen's words, just prior to her tragic ending, "I wish I had a boyfriend."

Cast
 Dominique Swain as Jefferson Roth
 Busy Philipps as Karen Carter
 Keri Lynn Pratt as Lisa Stockwell
 Nicholas M. Loeb as Jeremy
 Oliver Hudson as David
 Ryan Browning as Dan
 Joel West as Christopher 
 Thora Birch as Lincoln Roth
 Tell Draper as Todd Manning
 Ryan Sasson as Ryan
 Jenne Zblewski as Charlotte

References

External links
 

2000 films
2000 black comedy films
2000 directorial debut films
2000s teen comedy films
American black comedy films
American teen comedy films
Films set in Wisconsin
Metro-Goldwyn-Mayer direct-to-video films
2000s English-language films
2000s American films